Jean de Lastic was   Grand Master of the Order of the Knights Hospitaller from  1437 until his death in 1454.
Counted as the 35th Grand Master of the order (or the 36th if the partially recognized Riccardo Caracciolo is included), 
he was the first to actually use the title "Grand Master" (Grandis Magister).
During his rule, in 1440, an Ottoman fleet attacking Rhodes was successfully repelled.
During this time, the order was at the zenith of its power, and played a significant military role in the defense of the Mediterranean against Turkish encroachment.
His rule still saw the Fall of Constantinople of 1453, initiating a century of Ottoman naval dominance over the eastern Mediterranean. Under his successor, Jacques de Milly, the order was also divided by internal dispute.

References

External links 

Official website

Grand Masters of the Knights Hospitaller
1454 deaths
15th-century French people
Year of birth unknown